The 2018 Austrian Cup Final was played on 9 May 2018 between SK Sturm Graz and FC Red Bull Salzburg at Wörthersee Stadion, Klagenfurt, a neutral ground. The final was the culmination of the 2017–18 Austrian Cup, the 84th season of the Austrian Cup.

Sturm Graz won their fifth cup title after defeating Red Bull Salzburg 1–0 after extra time, which would have earned them a place in the second qualifying round of the 2018–19 UEFA Europa League, but they instead qualified for the UEFA Champions League by virtue of their second place finish in the 2017–18 Austrian Bundesliga.

Teams

Venue
Wörthersee Stadion is the home of SK Austria Klagenfurt and opened in 2007. It has a capacity of 32,000 spectators and is part of Sportpark Klagenfurt

Background
The Austrian Bundesliga clubs SK Sturm Graz and FC Red Bull Salzburg contested the final, with the winner earning a place in the second qualifying round of the 2018–19 UEFA Europa League. Since Sturm Graz qualified for the second qualifying round of the 2018–19 UEFA Champions League by virtue of its second place finish in the 2017–18 Austrian Bundesliga, Austria's last European place is given to FC Admira Wacker Mödling as the 5th place team of the 2017-18 Austrian Bundesliga. 

Sturm Graz competed in its ninth overall final, their first since 2010. Red Bull Salzburg made its fifth straight finals appearance (sixth in seven seasons and its 10th overall. Both clubs now have five total Austrian Cup championships. The two teams had never previously met in an Austrian Cup final, and Red Bull Salzburg won three of the four meetings during the regular season of the 2017-18 Austrian Football Bundesliga, outscoring Sturm Graz 13-5 over those four contests.

Route to the final

Note: In all results below, the score of the finalist is given first (H: home; A: away).

Match

Details

References

Austrian Cup Final
Austrian Cup
Austrian Cup Final
Sports competitions in Klagenfurt
Austrian Cup Final 2018
Austrian Cup Final 2018